Hyacinthe-François-Isaac Decomberousse (3 July 1786 – 23 May 1856) was a French dramatist. He wrote under the pen name « Montbrun »

Theatre 
 Le Lépreux de la vallée d'Aoste, 3-act melodrama with Théodore Baudouin d'Aubigny and Jean-Toussaint Merle, théâtre de la Porte-Saint-Martin, 13 August 1822 ;
 Jane Shore, 3 acts melodrama with Armand-François Jouslin de La Salle, Alphonse de Chavanges, théâtre de la Porte Saint-Martin, (1824)
 Le Docteur d'Altona, 3-act melodrama with Alphonse de Chavanges and Auguste Maillard, théâtre de la Porte Saint-Martin, (18 October 1825).
 

19th-century French dramatists and playwrights
Writers from Vienne, Isère
1786 births
1856 deaths